Raúl Daniel Abella (born 21 April 1953) is an Argentine biathlete. He competed in the 1980 Winter Olympics.

References

1953 births
Living people
Biathletes at the 1980 Winter Olympics
Argentine male biathletes
Olympic biathletes of Argentina